The sac spiders of the family Clubionidae have a very confusing taxonomic history. Once, this family was a large catch-all taxon for a disparate collection of spiders, similar only in that they had eight eyes arranged in two rows and conical anterior spinnerets that touched, and were wandering predators that built silken retreats, or sacs, usually on plant terminals, between leaves, under bark, or under rocks. These are now recognized to include several families, some of which are more closely related to the three-clawed spiders, like lynx and wolf spiders, than to Clubionidae and related families.

Genera 

The remnant Clubionidae now consist of a few over 500 species in 18 genera worldwide. However, "sac spider" used on its own should imply a member of the family Clubionidae, but other common names may use the phrase "sac spider" including:
 Anyphaenidae (anyphaenid sac spider)
 Corinnidae (corinnid sac spider)
 Liocranidae (liocranid sac spider)
 Miturgidae (long-legged sac spider)
 Tengellidae (merged into Zoropsidae)
 Zorocratidae (merged into Zoropsidae)

, the World Spider Catalog accepts the following genera:

Arabellata Baert, Versteirt & Jocqué, 2010 — New Guinea
Bucliona Benoit, 1977 — St. Helena, Kenya, Russian Far East, Korea, Japan, China, Taiwan
Clubiona Latreille, 1804 — Africa, North America, Asia, Oceania, South America, Europe, Panama
Clubionina Berland, 1947 — St. Paul Is.
Elaver O. Pickard-Cambridge, 1898 — North America, Caribbean, Central America, South America, Philippines
Femorbiona Yu & Li, 2021 — China, Vietnam
Invexillata Versteirt, Baert & Jocqué, 2010 — New Guinea
Malamatidia Deeleman-Reinhold, 2001 — Indonesia, Laos, Malaysia
Matidia Thorell, 1878 — Asia, Papua New Guinea
Nusatidia Deeleman-Reinhold, 2001 — Asia
Porrhoclubiona Lohmander, 1944 — Asia, Africa, Europe
Pristidia Deeleman-Reinhold, 2001 — Indonesia, Thailand, Malaysia
Pteroneta Deeleman-Reinhold, 2001 — Asia, Australia
Ramosatidia Yu & Li, 2021 — China
Scopalio Deeleman-Reinhold, 2001 — Indonesia
Simalio Simon, 1897 — Asia, Trinidad
Sinostidia Yu & Li, 2021 — China
Tixcocoba Gertsch, 1977 — Mexico

Additionally, the World Spider Catalog considers Carteroniella Strand, 1907 to be a nomen dubium.

In North America, the family as it is now recognised consists of only two genera, Clubiona and Elaver (formerly Clubionoides). Clubiona is nearly worldwide in distribution.

See also 
 List of Clubionidae species

References

External links 

 Platnick, N.I. 2003. World Spider Catalog 8.0
 Family Anyphaenidae Sac spiders, ghost spiders
 Australian sac spiders, family Clubionidae, Gnaphosidae, Miturgidae, Corinnidae